UWC Atlantic (formally the United World College of the Atlantic; and often referred to by its original name, Atlantic College) is a private boarding school in the Vale of Glamorgan in south Wales. Founded in 1962, it was the first of the United World Colleges and was among the first educational institutions in the world to follow an international curriculum; it helped create the International Baccalaureate Diploma Programme in the 1960s.

In addition to the IBDP, UWC Atlantic places student participation in community service at its core. It is known for its liberal and progressive education, its global ethos, and its strong focus on local and global sustainability. It is attended by approximately 350 students from more than 90 countries, the majority of whom are selected through their National Committees, which help fund their education through partial or full scholarships; over 65% of students who apply through national committees receive some form of scholarship or financial aid.

History 
Atlantic College was founded by Kurt Hahn, a German educationalist who had previously set up Gordonstoun School in Scotland, the Schule Schloss Salem and the Stiftung Louisenlund in Germany, and the Outward Bound movement. Hahn founded the institution as a practical response to the search for new and peaceful solutions in a post-war world riven by political, racial and economic divisions. Hahn had been invited by British Air Marshal Sir Lawrence Darvall to address the NATO Defence College in 1955, where he saw former enemies from several nations working together towards a common goal, and realised how much more could be done to overcome the hostility of the Cold War if young people from different nations could be brought together in a similar way. He envisaged a college for students who were already grounded in their own cultures but impressionable enough to learn from others. Drawn from all nations, the students would be selected purely on merit and potential, regardless of race, religion, nationality and background. From its founding, the school was intended to be the first of a series, initially to be named "The Atlantic Colleges."

On 19 September 1962, Atlantic College opened with nine teaching staff and 56 male students aged between 16 and 19 years from 12 counties; in 1967, the school became co-educational, with a cohort hailing from 35 nations. The school was hailed by The Times as "the most exciting experiment in education since the Second World War." The college was the result of Kurt Hahn's vision and the work of individuals such as the founding Headmaster Rear Admiral Desmond Hoare, Director of Studies Robert Backburn, Air Marshal Sir Lawrance Darvall, and Antonin Besse, who donated St Donat's Castle for the college's premises. 
In 1967, Lord Mountbatten of Burma became President of the organisation and the term United World Colleges came into existence, with an international office in London, and the school became the United World College of the Atlantic. Mountbatten was an enthusiastic UWC supporter and encouraged heads of state, politicians and personalities throughout the world to share his interest. He was personally involved in founding what became the third UWC – the United World College of South East Asia – in Singapore in 1975, following the founding of the second College, the Lester B Pearson United World College of the Pacific in Canada in 1974, named after Nobel Peace Prize winner and former Canadian Prime Minister Lester B. Pearson.

In 1978, Mountbatten passed the Presidency to his great-nephew, the then Prince of Wales, Charles. Former presidents of the United World Colleges also include Nelson Mandela of South Africa (from 1995 until his death in 2013), a position he shared with the current holder of the position, Queen Noor of Jordan. Queen Elizabeth II of the United Kingdom was a Patron of the college, from its early days until her death in 2022.

Today, the school is known as UWC Atlantic, or by its full name, the United World College of the Atlantic.

College 
The college's stated mission is to "make education a force to unite people, nations, and cultures for peace and a sustainable future". Students from over 90 countries participate in UWC Atlantic's two-year programme, in which they combine academic studies with activities and service. Admission into United World Colleges, and scholarship awards, are decided by national UWC committees around the world and the Global Selection Programme.

Academics 
Atlantic College was one of the first colleges in the world, and first in UK, to follow an international curriculum, and offers the International Baccalaureate Diploma Programme. The college was one of the key institutions involved in the creation of the International Baccalaureate, and continues to be actively involved in its development. In May 1967, 108 students at Atlantic College joined 37 at the International School of Geneva to sit the first trial exams for the IB.  Having already participated in these pilot exams in parallel to offering the British GCE A-Levels, in 1971 Atlantic College became the first school in the world to entirely abandon a national curriculum and qualification in favor of the new program.

The college also offered a Pre-Diploma course, offering 15-16-year-old students the chance to study IGCSEs among the rest of the college's older population. This programme ended in 2019.

IB graduates are typically accepted at the most competitive colleges and universities around the world, with many enrolling in Ivy League universities in the United States as well as British universities. Students at the college are eligible, after graduation, to participate in the Davis United World College Scholars Program, which funds undergraduate study for UWC students at selected universities in the United States.

Service 
Service has been a core part of the college's ethos and structure since its founding, rooted in Kurt Hahn's philosophy and belief that physical activity and especially service to others were vital elements of a well rounded education. At the beginning of each year at the college, students are obliged to select 3 activities that they will each carry out for at least 2 hours a week as part of the International Baccalaureate's CAS requirement. The opportunity to undertake weekly community service, physical activity, and creative activity offers students a 'counterbalance' to the Diploma Programme's academic pressures, and allows the students an opportunity to reflect on their experiences and develop specific interests and passions.

Additionally, UWC Atlantic runs a "Project Week" every year, giving students a change to delve into either service based or expedition based experiences, and hosts student-ran Conferences on a quarterly basis offering deep introspection to students into the chosen conference topic.

Boat-building

The college has a strong tradition of boat design and boat building. The Atlantic College Lifeboat Station stood within its grounds as an active RNLI lifeboat station from 1963, when it opened as one of the first experimental inshore lifeboat (ILB) stations established in the United Kingdom, and staffed mostly by students, until 2013.

Much of the development of the Atlantic 21, 75 and 85 classes of lifeboat took place at Atlantic College. What was to become the world's most widely used type of craft for inshore rescue, the rigid inflatable boat (RIB), was originally conceived, designed, prototyped, tested, and built at the college under its founding headmaster, retired Rear-Admiral Desmond Hoare. The B Class Atlantic Inshore Lifeboat was named by the RNLI after its birthplace. It has often been claimed that, had the college earned royalties on every rigid-hulled inflatable boat now in service, its scholarship fund would have never looked back; instead, Desmond Hoare, who eventually patented the design in 1973, sold the rights to the RNLI for the nominal fee of one pound; he did not cash the cheque, which is still displayed at the college. David Sutcliffe, a member of the founding staff of Atlantic College in 1962 and its second headmaster, published The RIB The Rigid-Hulled Inflatable Lifeboat and its Place of Birth The Atlantic College in 2010, a book that tells the story of the inception of the RIB (rigid inflatable boat).

The building of ILB training vessels at the school is a longstanding student activity, and were used for practice and training of the student-led RNLI crews at the station until its closure in 2013. In 2014 students at the college helped design a new boat in conjunction with companies in Japan, to help in the aftermath of a tsunami.

Grounds and facilities 

UWC Atlantic is located at St Donat's Castle, a 12th-century castle near the town of Llantwit Major on the South Wales coast, overlooking the Bristol Channel. The castle has been continuously inhabited since it was first built. The extensive grounds also include the 12th-century St Donat's Church and the historic terraced gardens, as well as preserved woodland, farmland and Heritage Coastline. St Donat's Castle is the main building of the college, housing the Tudor great hall, the gothic dining hall, Bradenstoke Hall (today used for assemblies and performances), an extensive 25,000-book library, staff offices, student common areas and certain academic departments. Before being purchased for use by the college by Antonin Besse, it was owned by William Randolph Hearst, who undertook major renovations, including transporting the roof and fireplace from the Bradenstoke Priory in Wiltshire and an ornate, gilded and vaulted ceiling from a church in Boston, Lincolnshire.

Lessons take place in modern academic blocks built in the 1960s–80s, converted Medieval estate buildings, and the castle itself. Next to the castle are the Social and Gymnasium blocks, and the 12th-century tithe barn (with a contemporary extension), which is both used by the college and open to the public as a theatre, arts centre and cinema. The college owns sports fields, tennis courts, and in addition to indoor and outdoor swimming pools have a range of surf and rescue equipment, kayaks, sailing boats, RNLI training boats, and a cliff suitable for climbing and rescue practice.

In 2004, the college installed a carbon neutral biomass heating system to replace an ageing and unsustainable oil-based system. It runs on locally sourced sustainable woodchip biomass, and makes the campus the largest site in the UK to be heated in such a way. Students live in eight modern accommodation houses built in the castle grounds named after either ancient Welsh kingdoms or benefactors to the college: Kurt Hahn, Antonin Besse, Powys, Whitaker, Gwynedd, Madiba, Tice and Sunley. The Pentti Kouri house, formerly Dyfed, was refurbished in the autumn of 2008 to include technologies such as geothermal heating and an energy usage monitoring system to lessen its impact on the environment.

Due largely to the college's setting at the castle, in combination with its reputation as a progressive institution, media sometimes use terms such as "Hogwarts for hippies" to describe the school.

The college has hosted several royal visitors to the castle, including  Queen Elizabeth II and Prince Philip,  Lord Mountbatten, Prince Charles and Princess Diana, as well as  Emperor Akihito and Empress Michiko of Japan and Queen Beatrix and Prince Claus of the Netherlands, whose son, Willem-Alexander was a student at the college at the time. The fiftieth anniversary of the college in 2012 was marked by a visit by Queen Noor of Jordan, in her role as President of the United World Colleges. Senior politicians such as former Prime Minister of Canada Lester B. Pearson and former Prime Minister of the United Kingdom Alec Douglas-Home also visited St Donat's, as have several Ambassadors.

Notable alumni and students 

Sir Howard Newby (1947–), former Vice-Chancellor of the Universities of Liverpool, West England, and Southampton
David Ceperley (1949–), theoretical physicist 
Eyal Ofer (1950–), Israeli billionaire and philanthropist
 Wang Guangya (1950–), Chinese diplomat
Jorma Ollila (1950–), Finnish executive, former CEO of Nokia Corporation
Seppo Honkapohja (1951–), Finnish economist, board member of the Bank of Finland and former professor of Macroeconomics at the University of Cambridge
Edoardo Agnelli (1954–2000), only son of Giovanni Agnelli (Italian industrialist and head of Fiat)
Kari Blackburn (1954–2007), BBC reporter
Aernout van Lynden (1955–), journalist
Hakeem Belo-Osagie (1955–), Nigerian businessman, Chairman of the United Bank for Africa
David Voas (1955–), sociologist, Head of the Department of Social Science at the UCL Institute of Education
 Ghaleb Cachalia (1956–), South African politician
Fernando Alonso (1956–), Spanish engineer, Head of the Military Aircraft division of Airbus Defence and Space
Charles Kuta (1956–), American computer engineer, co-founder of Silicon Graphics
Uberto Pasolini (1957–), Italian film producer
Jonathan Michie  (1957–), economist, President of Kellogg College, University of Oxford
Tim Owen  (1958–), barrister
Olivia Bloomfield, Baroness Bloomfield of Hinton Waldrist (1960–), life peer and member of the House of Lords
Nick Brown (1962–), academic, Principal of Linacre College, University of Oxford
David Cunliffe  (1963–), New Zealand politician, former Minister for Health and Minister for Immigration
Julie Payette  (1963–), Canadian engineer, scientist and astronaut, former Governor General of Canada
Helen Pankhurst  (1964–), women's rights activist and scholar
João Pedro Cravinho (1964–): Portuguese diplomat and politician, Minister of Foreign Affairs
King Willem-Alexander of the Netherlands (1967–)
Eluned Morgan, Baroness Morgan of Ely (1967–), life peer and member of the House of Lords
Luke Harding (1968–), political journalist at The Guardian
Michiel van Hulten (1969–), former Dutch politician
Elsie Effah Kaufmann  (1969–), Ghanaian academic and biomedical engineer
Saba Douglas-Hamilton (1970–), Kenyan conservationist and TV presenter
Jakob von Weizsäcker (1970–), German politician and economist
Louise Leakey (1972–), Kenyan palaeontologist and anthropologist
Wangechi Mutu (1972–), Kenyan-American artist and sculptor
Horatio Clare (1973–), author
Andreas Loewe (1973–), German-Australian historian and academic, Dean of Melbourne
 Maciej Golubiewski (1976–), Polish political scientist and diplomat, former Consul General of Poland in New York City
Sally El Hosaini (1976–), Welsh-Egyptian film director and writer
E. Tendayi Achiume (1982–), professor of law
Princess Raiyah bint Hussein of Jordan (1986–), daughter of King Hussein and Queen Noor
Princess Elisabeth, Duchess of Brabant (2001–), heir apparent to the Belgian throne
Leonor, Princess of Asturias (2005–), heir presumptive to the Spanish throne
Princess Alexia of the Netherlands (2005–), daughter of King Willem-Alexander and Queen Máxima

Principals
 Naheed Bardai, July 2021
 Peter Howe, 2017 – 2021
 Gerry Holden (Caretaker), Jan 2016 – Mar 2017
 John Walmsley, Jan 2012 – Dec 2015
 Paul Motte (acting), Dec 2010 – Jan 2012
 Neil Richards MBE, 2007 – Dec 2010
 Malcolm McKenzie, 2000–2007
 Colin Jenkins, 1990–2000
 Andrew Stuart, 1982–1990
 David Sutcliffe, 1969–1982
 Desmond Hoare, 1962–1969

References

External links

Atlantic College
United World Colleges
AC (for and by students and teachers)
United Words (UWC Student Magazine founded and led by Atlantic College Students)

Educational institutions established in 1962
1962 establishments in Wales
International Baccalaureate schools in Wales
Private schools in the Vale of Glamorgan
Universities and colleges in Wales
International schools
International educational organizations